The following lists events that happened during 1996 in Luxembourg.

Incumbents
 Grand Duke – Jean
 Prime Minister – Jean-Claude Juncker
 Deputy Prime Minister – Jacques Poos
 President of the Chamber of Deputies – Jean Spautz
 President of the Council of State – Paul Beghin
 Mayor of Luxembourg City – Lydie Polfer

Events

April
 8 April – SES launches its sixth satellite, Astra 1F.

May
 25 May – Union Luxembourg win the Luxembourg Cup, beating Jeunesse Esch 3–1 in the final.

June
 9 June – Italy's Alberto Elli wins the 1996 Tour de Luxembourg.
 June – National Museum of Natural History moves to its new premises in Grund, in Luxembourg City.

August
 August – The section of the A7 motorway between Erpeldange and Friedhaff opens.

September
 23 September - The section of the A1 motorway between Irrgarten and Kirchberg opens, completing the motorway and also the south-eastern bypass of Luxembourg City.

Deaths

Footnotes

 
Years of the 20th century in Luxembourg
Luxembourg
1990s in Luxembourg
Luxembourg